Marc Smyth (born 27 December 1982) is a Scottish-born Northern Irish former professional footballer who played as a defender. He is currently Head of Academy at Cliftonville after retiring.

Career

In his Scottish Football League career, Smyth (pronounced Smith) has also played for Ayr United, Partick Thistle and Airdrie United. Smyth started his career in Junior football with Ayrshire side Glenafton Athletic following a youth career with English side Blackpool where he won youth caps for Northern Ireland.

Before moving into the professional game at the age of 19, Edinburgh-born Smyth played junior football with Ayrshire side Glenafton Athletic.

He then signed for played for Ayr United, before moving onto Partick Thistle and Airdrie United before signing with Greenock Morton in 2010.

In season 2008-09, he scored the winning penalty for Airdrie United in the 2008 Scottish Challenge Cup Final against Ross County, after a 2–2 draw.

Smyth signed for Greenock Morton at the start of the 2010–11 season, but was released in May 2012.

Smyth signed for Cliftonville F.C. in June 2012.

International career

As a youth player at Blackpool, Smyth played for Northern Ireland's U16 and U18 sides.

See also

Greenock Morton F.C. season 2010–11 | 2011–12

Honours
Airdrie United
Scottish Challenge Cup: 2008–09

External links

References

1982 births
Living people
Footballers from Edinburgh
Association football defenders
Scottish footballers
Ayr United F.C. players
Partick Thistle F.C. players
Airdrieonians F.C. players
Greenock Morton F.C. players
Scottish Football League players
Scottish Junior Football Association players
Blackpool F.C. players
Glenafton Athletic F.C. players
Northern Ireland youth international footballers
Cliftonville F.C. players
NIFL Premiership players